Tomas Hogan is mayor of Miramar, Buenos Aires Province. Prior to becoming mayor, Hogan was a municipal intendant.

Born in 1950, Hogan became mayor of Miramar in 1999 after a landslide election victory. In 2010, he was selected to replace Silvia Caballero in the Farm Ministry commission.

See also
 General Alvarado Partido

References

Sources
 Municipalidad de General Alvarado Retrieved: 2010-03-30. 

Living people
1950 births
Mayors of places in Argentina